Discovery Girls was a bimonthly magazine for girls ages 8 to 13. Written “by girls, for girls,” the publication honestly addresses the issues faced by preteen girls. First published in 2000, the magazine had a circulation of 195,062 in 2012.

History
Discovery Girls was founded in 2000 by Catherine Lee. As part of the process of creating the first issue, Lee selected twelve girls from local schools to provide input on what is important to them. Lee continued to use the approach. From 2000 to 2012, for each issue 12 girls were selected from various states. The girls attended a two-day photo shoot and provided ideas and content for the issue. In 2012, this switched to a once-a-year camp for 36 girls in the US and Canada that would provide images and content for a year's issues.

Magazine features
Most of the regular features contain content sent in by readers. These features include:
 My Worst Day and how I survived it  
 Embarrassing moments
 Ask Ali
 Health and beauty advice
 The great debate
 Mailbag
 Contests

Other features of the magazine:

 Special Feature
 You Said It  
 Creative Corner 
 Quizzes

Books
Discovery Girls has published five books based on the most popular topics from the magazine:
 Friendship Hardship
 Sticky Situations And How To Get Through Them 
 Ask Ali: All the Advice You’ll Ever Need 
 My Worst Day and How I Survived It 
 Growing Up: Everything You Need To Know About Your Changing Body

Honors
Discovery Girls has received the Parents' Choice Award, National Parenting Publications Award and the iParenting Media Award.

References

Bimonthly magazines published in the United States
Children's magazines published in the United States
Lifestyle magazines published in the United States
Magazines established in 2000
Magazines published in California